Maria Ortiz (1603 – 1646) was a Brazilian heroine, famous for her defense of Espírito Santo against the attempted Dutch invasion in 1624.

References

 (2003), Revista do Instituto Histórico e Geográfico do Espírito Santo, nr. 57

1603 births

1646 deaths
17th-century Brazilian people
Women in 17th-century warfare
Women in war in South America